Lee Teng may refer to:

 Lee Teng (Singapore) (born 1984), Singaporean television host
 Lee C. Teng, American physicist